Mass & Volume is an EP by American grindcore band Pig Destroyer which was released on March 5, 2013 as a digital release and October 14, 2014 as a physical release through Relapse Records. The EP was written and recorded during the final day of the Phantom Limb sessions. It is dedicated to the memory of Pat Egan, a member of the Relapse Records family who died on February 18, 2013. All proceeds from the sale of the record were donated to Egan's daughter's college fund.

Track listing

Personnel
Pig Destroyer
J.R. Hayes - Vocals
Blake Harrison - Noise, Samples
Scott Hull - Guitars
Brian Harvey - Drums

Production
Arik Roper - Cover
Orion Landau - Artwork
Josh Sisk - Photography

References

Pig Destroyer albums
2013 EPs
Relapse Records EPs